Gabrijel Smičiklas (24 March 1783 – 14 March 1856) was a Croatian Greek Catholic hierarch. He was the bishop from 1834 to 1856 of the Eastern Catholic Eparchy of Križevci.

Born in Sošice, Habsburg monarchy  (present day – Croatia) in 1783, he was ordained a priest on 11 June 1808 for the Eparchy of Križevci. Fr. Smičiklas was the Rector of the Greek Catholic Seminary in Zagreb from 1809 to 1810.

He was confirmed as the Bishop by the Holy See on 23 June 1834. He was consecrated to the Episcopate on 21 September 1834. The principal consecrator was Bishop Samuil Vulcan.

He died in Križevci on 14 March 1856.

References 

1783 births
1856 deaths
19th-century Eastern Catholic bishops
Croatian Eastern Catholics
Greek Catholic Church of Croatia and Serbia